Secţia Intervenţii Anti-Teroriste (Counter-Terrorist Intervention Squad) is a special unit within the Romanian Protection and Guard Service.

External links
  Unofficial site

Protection and Guard Service
Special forces of Romania